Calamuchita might refer to several places in the province of Córdoba, Argentina:
 Santa Rosa de Calamuchita (city)
 Calamuchita Department (administrative subdivision of the province)